Bruno Mehsarosch (9 March 1934 – 29 December 2009) was an Austrian footballer.

References

1934 births
2009 deaths
Association football forwards
Austrian footballers
SK Rapid Wien players